Georg Michael Anton Kerschensteiner (July 29, 1854 in München – January 15, 1932 in München) was a German professor and educational theorist. He was director of public schools in Munich from 1895 to 1919 and became a professor at the University of Munich in 1920. The author of Theorie der Bildungsorganisation (1933), Kerschensteiner is primarily known for developing a pragmatic approach to education, which included the integration of academic study with physical activity and the establishment of a network of vocational schools.

External links
 
 Georg Kerschensteiner in der Datenbank der Reichstagsabgeordneten
 Biografie auf der Website der Archivschule Marburg
 Kurzbiographie
 Kolloquium anlässlich des 150. Geburtstags von Georg Kerschensteiner, WiSe 2004/2005 an der LMU München Vier Vorträge im QuickTime-Format, zum Teil mit Simultananzeige der PowerPoint-Präsentation
 Preise der Deutschen Physikalischen Gesellschaft (darunter auch der Georg-Kerschensteiner-Preis)
 
 
 

1854 births
1932 deaths
People from the Kingdom of Bavaria
Progressive People's Party (Germany) politicians
Members of the 13th Reichstag of the German Empire
Academic staff of the Ludwig Maximilian University of Munich
German male writers